The Women's Open event at the 2010 South American Games was held on March 21.

Medalists

Results

Round Robin

Points system:

Contests

References

 Medalists

W999
South American Games 2010
South American Games W999